Anwoth Old Church is a ruined church building which was built in 1626 to serve the parish of Anwoth in Dumfries and Galloway, Scotland. It is roofless, but much of the walls remain, including the west gable which is surmounted by a bellcote. A number of substantial monuments exist within the church and its surrounding churchyard.

Anwoth was the seat of Samuel Rutherford's ministry from 1627 until he was banned from preaching and exiled to Aberdeen in 1636. The church underwent substantial improvements in the early 18th Century, and remained in use until 1826 when it was partly dismantled and Anwoth Parish Church was built. The remains of the building, along with its churchyard, are designated a Category A listed building; a tomb of the Gordon family and a 12-century cross slab within the churchyard are separately designated a scheduled monument.

The churchyard was used as a shooting location for the 1973 horror film The Wicker Man.

History

The earliest records of religious activity at Anwoth date back to the 12th century, when the parish was granted to Holyrood Abbey. A cross slab, dating to around 1100, was found in the churchyard in the late 19th century.

Anwoth Old Church itself was built in 1626; the inscription in the arch above its doorway shows a date of 1627, but this was added much later and was likely influenced by the date when Samuel Rutherford started his ministry at the church. Rutherford came to Anwoth in 1627, shortly after receiving his licence to preach the gospel, at the invitation of John Gordon of Kenmure. Gordon died in 1634, and the following year an elaborate monument was constructed within the church, commemorating Gordon, his parents, and his two wives. Rutherford remained at the parish until 1636, when his disagreements with the church authorities led to his prohibition from practising as a minister and exile to Aberdeen.

Substantial improvements were made to the church in 1710 by William Maxwell of Cardoness and his wife, Nicola Stewart. These probably involved internal rearrangement of the church so that its pulpit backed onto the south wall, the addition of round-arched doors and rectangular windows to the gable ends, and the bellcote to the west gable. The church continued to be used until 1826, when it was dismantled and a new church constructed. The new church, Anwoth Parish Church, was built by Walter Newall for the Church of Scotland.

The cross slab and Gordon tomb were scheduled in 1963; the rest of the structure, and the churchyard around it, were designated a Category A listed building in 1971.

The churchyard was used as a location for a number of scenes in the 1973 horror film The Wicker Man, in which a Christian policeman, played by Edward Woodward, investigates the disappearance of a missing girl in a remote community led by Christopher Lee, and is eventually burned alive as a sacrifice in a pagan ritual.

Description

The remains of the church are roofless, and form a long, narrow rectangle ( by ), typical of early post-Reformation Scottish churches, and oriented west to east. There is a substantial bellcote at the apex of the west gable.

Inside the church, in a blocked doorway in the south wall where the entrance to the church would originally have been, there is now a panel inscribed "Rebuilt Anno 1710 by WM, NS", and displaying the arms of Maxwell of Cardoness and his wife Stewart.

In the centre of the church is a large sarcophagus monument. Above a plinth is a tomb chest, which is decorated with an array of geometric patterns, scrollwork, finials, skeletons, crossbones, and the arms of the Gordons. The memorial bears initials for John Gordon, his parents William Gordon of Cullindoch and Marion Mure, his first wife Margaret McClellan, and his second wife Christian MacCadam, and there are panels with inscriptions dedicated to each of the three women.

To the north west of the church stands the 12th century cross slab. Also in the churchyard is a monument to John Bell, a covenanter who was shot in 1685, and an early 19th-century mausoleum, which was rebuilt in 1878 by Sir William Maxwell of Cardoness. This is a large, Egypto-Grecian structure, with granite walls and a wooden door.

References

Sources

Listed churches in Scotland
Category A listed buildings in Dumfries and Galloway
Church of Scotland churches
Scheduled monuments in Scotland